This Is a Life? is a 1955 Warner Bros. Merrie Melodies animated cartoon directed by Friz Freleng, written by Warren Foster, and produced by Edward Selzer, with music directed by Milt Franklyn. The short was released on July 9, 1955, and stars Bugs Bunny. The voices were performed by Mel Blanc, Arthur Q. Bryan, and June Foray.  This is one of the few Bugs Bunny cartoons whose title does not contain Bugs, bunny, rabbit/wabbit or hare.

This is one of the only two Warner Bros. shorts in the original classic era of Looney Tunes (the other being A Star Is Bored) in which Bugs is paired with his main three antagonists. This is also the first time that June Foray provides the voice of Granny, which Foray would then reprise for nearly 60 years.

Plot
In a parody of This Is Your Life, Elmer Fudd (aping Ralph Edwards) is the host and Bugs Bunny is the guest of honor, much to the shock and disgust of Daffy Duck. Granny, who is sitting next to Daffy and trying to watch the program, hits him on the head with the handle of her umbrella to keep him quiet after being irritated with him ranting about not being the "guest of honor". Daffy goes out of his way to try and sabotage Bugs by making irate comments about him and goading Elmer to throw Bugs out. Each time, Granny becomes increasingly annoyed by him and hits Daffy on the head with the handle of her umbrella (angrily telling him to "Shut up!").

Meanwhile, Bugs reminisces about his childhood and then with Elmer and Yosemite Sam about his previous encounters with both of them (reviewed via stock footage from the past Bugs Bunny cartoons A Hare Grows in Manhattan, Hare Do and Buccaneer Bunny), with the last two showing Bugs getting the best of them, as usual.

Elmer and Sam plan to finally get even with Bugs by presenting him with a special "gift" — a time bomb wrapped up in a box — in appreciation of their "friendship". However, a jealous Daffy stubbornly refusing to believe that he is NOT the guest of honor, grabs the gift after a bout with the three of them passing it off to each other. Sam, Elmer and Bugs cover their ears as they know what the gift really is-but not Daffy, who says "After all, this should've been MINE anyway! I really deserve it!"-, and takes the resulting explosion backstage. Naturally, Daffy angrily returns and ends up telling Bugs: "You're... You're... You're despicable!", then leaves the stage in a huff.

Voice cast and additional crew
 Mel Blanc as Bugs Bunny, Daffy Duck, Yosemite Sam and Announcer
 Arthur Q. Bryan as Elmer Fudd (uncredited)
 June Foray as Granny (uncredited)
 Film Edited by Treg Brown (uncredited)
 Original Story by Michael Maltese and Tedd Pierce (both uncredited)
 Archive Backgrounds by Paul Julian and Philip DeGuard (both uncredited)

Music
The cartoon uses arranged music for the opening title card and the introductory credits before showing the title of the picture.

Home media
This Is a Life? is featured uncut on the Looney Tunes Super Stars DVD set, Daffy Duck: Frustrated Fowl albeit cropped to widescreen. It was later re-released in its original aspect ratio on the  Blu-ray set- Bugs Bunny 80th Anniversary Collection.

See also
 Looney Tunes and Merrie Melodies filmography (1950–1959)
 List of Bugs Bunny cartoons
 List of Yosemite Sam cartoons

References

External links 
 

1955 films
1955 animated films
1955 short films
Merrie Melodies short films
Warner Bros. Cartoons animated short films
Bugs Bunny films
Daffy Duck films
Short films directed by Friz Freleng
Films scored by Milt Franklyn
1950s Warner Bros. animated short films
Yosemite Sam films
Elmer Fudd films
1950s English-language films